James Hill may refer to:

Law and politics 
 French Hill (politician) (born 1956), born James French Hill, American politician from Arkansas
 James Hill (antiquary) (died 1727), English barrister and antiquary
 James L. Hill (1834–1888), American local politician (Madison, Wisconsin)
 Sir James Hill, 1st Baronet (1849–1936), British politician
 James Hill (Labour politician) (1899–1966), British MP for Midlothian
 Sir James Hill (Conservative politician) (1926–1999), British MP for Southampton Test
 James Hill (Wisconsin legislator) (1825–1897), American politician
James Hill (Mississippi politician) (1830s–1903), Reconstruction-era politician
 James Clinkscales Hill (1924–2017), American federal judge
 James Ferguson Hill (1871–1950), politician in Ontario, Canada
 James T. Hill Jr. (active 1944–53), American military attorney
 James W. Hill (1791–1864), American farmer, lawyer, and politician

Military 

 James Hill (Medal of Honor, 1863), American Civil War Medal of Honor recipient
 James Hill (Medal of Honor, 1864), American Civil War Medal of Honor recipient
 James Hill (British Army officer) (1911–2006), British World War II paratroop commander
 James E. Hill (1921–1999), United States Air Force 4-star general
 James A. Hill (1923–2010), United States Air Force 4-star general
 James T. Hill (born 1946), United States Army 4-star general

Sports 
 James Hill (1910s footballer) (active 1917–21), English footballer
 James Hill (footballer, born 2002), English footballer
 James Enoch Hill (born 1929), American Olympic shooter
 James Hill (rower) (born 1930), New Zealand Olympic rower
 Dave Hill (golfer) (James David Hill, 1937–2011), American golfer
 James Hill (American football) (born 1974), American football player

Entertainment
 James Hill (folk musician), British fiddler and composer
 James John Hill (1811–1882), English landscape and portrait painter
 James Hill (British director) (1919–1994), British film and television director and producer
 James Hill (American film producer) (1916–2001), American film producer
 James William Hill (born 1953), American filmmaker and political theorist
 James Hill (Canadian musician) (born 1980), Canadian ukulele player and educator
 James Hill, American member of The Fairfield Four gospel group
 James Hill (TV personality) (born 1987), English reality TV personality
 James Hill (J. Hill, active 1974 and after), American big band musician and arranger
 Pseudonym of Storm Jameson (1891–1986), English journalist and novelist

Other
 James Hill (master mason) (died 1734), British master mason
 James Hill (surgeon) (1703–1776), Scottish surgeon
 James Hill (merchant) (c. 1826–1901), founder of James Hill & Sons, South Australian motor cycle dealers
 James J. Hill (James Jerome Hill, 1838–1916), Canadian-American railroad magnate
 James G. Hill (1841–1914), American architect
 James B. Hill (1856–1945), American inventor
 James Peter Hill (1873–1954), British-born Australian embryologist
 James DeWitt Hill (1882–1927), American mail pilot
 James M. Hill (1899–1962), Canadian Roman Catholic bishop, first president of St. Thomas College
 James N. Hill (1943–1997), American archaeologist

See also 
 Cape James Hill, Greenland
 James J. Hill House, a house built by railroad magnate James J. Hill in Saint Paul, Minnesota
 James J. Hill Reference Library, public business research library in Saint Paul, Minnesota named after railroad magnate James J. Hill
 James J. Hill Sapphire, gemstone named after railroad magnate James J. Hill
 James M. Hill Memorial High School, high school in Miramichi, New Brunswick, Canada
 Jim Hill (disambiguation)
 Jimmy Hill (disambiguation)